Brookdale Park is a county park located in the townships of Bloomfield, New Jersey, and Montclair. Designed by the Olmsted Brothers landscape design firm,  are in Bloomfield; Brookdale Park is part of the Essex County park system. It is partially forested and partially lawns, with paths going through.

Overview
Going through the park is a circular, one way road, with three roads leading out of the park. There are many entrances for pedestrians, and there are two parking lots of approximately forty spots each. The road goes around parts of the park that have many athletic fields, park buildings, and other facilities. In the southern end of this area is the great meadow, and on the northern side there are the playgrounds, baseball/softball fields, and the stadium with the grandstand, track, and turf soccer field.

On the outside of the roadway there are many paths through the wood of stately trees that is the western half of the park. This part of the park is mostly in Montclair. Many minor facilities and areas are in the Western half. On this side there is a road entrance, the Rose Garden, the Tennis Courts, and the Dog Park. In the south there is another car entrance. In the northwestern corner there is a smaller field and the Archery range.

History
Before Brookdale was a park, the area was used by the First Nations Lenape Native Americans, later known as the Delaware, as a planting/gathering ground. In the late 17th century, Dutch pioneers took over the area, farming rhubarb on it, and put their houses there. This was the beginning of what would grow into Speertown and then be merged with Cranetown to make Montclair. The Brookdale area was originally called Stonehouse Plains by the Dutch.

Land started to be purchased in 1928 and all the land,  in total, were purchased by 1931. Frederick Law Olmsted Firm was chosen as the firm to design the park, and they completed most of the park by 1930 but the Great Depression slowed work down. It was finished in 1937. This firm is well known for designing much of the National Mall in Washington, D.C., and Central Park in New York City.

Old timers recall the park being the site of the area's coal/wood ash dump. Off Grove Street and down what is now Chester Road, the dirt lane saw horse-drawn ash wagons carrying the discarded ashes and clinkers of coal-burning furnaces collected from homes in the surrounding towns. As coal was replaced by oil and then gas as a heating fuel, the dump became part of the future Essex County park site. 

On January 15, 2023 at 11:30 pm, a fatal one-car crash occurred on the downhill left bend of West Circuit Drive. An SUV left the roadway striking a lamp post, an exercise beam and a tree at high speed. Three minors in the car were injured and taken to local hospitals. One boy, 16-year-old Nathan Latifi, died in the accident. All four occupants were students at Glen Ridge High School.

Amenities

 1½ mile fitness course
 softball/baseball fields
 Archery field
 picnic grounds
 Bike and running races
 Grandstand
 Restrooms
 Interpretive Trail 
 Playgrounds
 Annual arts and crafts festival
 11 Tennis Courts
 Formal rose garden with over 100 different species
 Summer concerts and Fourth of July celebrations
 Fireworks displays
 Dog Park 
 Soccer Fields 
 A block away from Yantacaw Brook Park
 Mountain bike trail

Gallery
Footnote:

References

External links
Essex County Parks

County parks in New Jersey
Bloomfield, New Jersey
Montclair, New Jersey
Upper Montclair, New Jersey
Parks in Essex County, New Jersey
Frederick Law Olmsted works